Civil Lines was an Indian literary magazine, launched in 1994 by publisher Ravi Dayal. In all its years of existence, the "magazine" has published exactly five issues, and none at all since the death of Ravi Dayal in 2006. Since the magazine is still nominally in existence, and was never "functional" to begin with, it cannot be said to be "defunct."

Inception
Ravi Dayal, the magazine's publisher, had worked with Oxford University Press between 1971 and 1987, initially as an editor and later as the CEO of OUP's Delhi office. After his retirement in 1987, he opened his own publishing company, Ravi Dayal Publishers, which did fairly well. Encouraged by this relative success, he decided to start a literary magazine in English, and in 1994, he finally started Civil Lines.

Periodicity
The magazine sought to challenge the traditional literary model by refusing to publish to a set schedule. Instead, it prioritized quality, with issues appearing only when the editors felt that they had an adequate quantity of intelligent, well-written and inspirational material to justify publication. The result has been five issues to date, all defined (or so the editors claim) by their eclecticism, intelligence and originality.

Editorial focus
Inspired by the British magazine Granta, the magazine focused on high quality unpublished fiction, personal history, reportage and inquiring journalism intended to appeal to intellectual, literate Indians living in urban areas.

The five issues of Civil lines were edited by Rukun Advani (two issues), Ivan Hutnik, Mukul Kesavan and Kai Friese (one issue each). Civil lines was edited by practicing writers rather than academics. It therefore had no defined literary manifesto which determined content. Civil Lines is ultimately a testimony to power of the story to describe and illuminate.

Termination
Ravi Dayal died on 4 June 2006 at the age of 69, and the magazine can be considered defunct from this date onwards. A book entitled "Written For Ever: The Best of Civil Lines", edited by Rukun Advani and dedicated to Ravi Dayal as well as Dharma Kumar, was published by Penguin Viking, New Delhi, in late 2009. This book is a compendium of nearly all the writings ever published in Civil lines.

Further reading
 Civil lines: new writing from India, by Rukun Advani. Published by Orient Blackswan, 1995. . Excerpts
 Civil lines: new writing from India, by Rukun Advani, Mukul Kesavan, Ivan Hutnik. Published by Orient Blackswan, 2001. . Excerpts
 Written For Ever: The Best of Civil Lines, edited by Rukun Advani, published by Penguin Viking, New Delhi, 2009.
 Achal Prabhala, Civil Lines in Chimurenga Library, 2008.

References

This article uses text from the Chimurengal Library under the GFDL

External links
 A Review of Civil Lines:4 India Today.

1994 establishments in Delhi
English-language magazines published in India
Irregularly published magazines
Literary magazines published in India
Magazines established in 1994
Magazines published in Delhi